The 2018–19 Rink Hockey Euroleague is the 54th season of Europe's premier club roller hockey tournament organised by World Skate Europe-Rink Hockey Committee, and the 22nd season since it was renamed from European Champion Clubs' Cup to Euroleague.

The defending champions Barcelona were eliminated by Porto in the semi-finals. In the final, Sporting CP beat Porto 5–2 to win their second trophy in the competition, while Porto lost their 10th consecutive final and 12th overall.

Team allocation

Association ranking

For the 2018–19 Rink Hockey Euroleague, the associations were allocated places according to their coefficient, which takes into account the performance of each association's representative teams in European competitions between the 2014–15 and the 2017–18 seasons. The coefficient is calculated by dividing the total of points accumulated by the number of participating teams.

Participation is reserved to teams from associations that have an effective capacity to organise annually their own national championships. They will all have at least one team entering the competition. To allocate the other nine places, the D'Hondt method was applied to the coefficient of each association. In case of withdrawals, priority would be given according to the order established by the D'Hondt method.

Teams
League positions of the previous season shown in parentheses (TH: Title holders). As English champions King's Lynn resigned to its place, that was occupied by a fourth Italian team following the allocation criteria.

Round dates
The schedule of the competition is as follows.

Draw
The 16 teams were allocated into four pots, with the title holders, Reus Deportiu, being placed directly as head-team of the Group A. The other three seeded teams will be from the three top ranked federations according to these priorities:
 National champions of those leagues.
 Highest ranked teams.

In each group, teams played against each other home-and-away in a home-and-away round-robin format.

Group stage
The 16 teams were allocated into four pots, with the title holders, Reus Deportiu, being placed as seeded team in the Group A automatically. The other 3 seeded teams, Porto, Barcelona and Amatori Lodi, were automatically placed in groups B, C and D, respectively. The rest of the teams were drawn into four groups of four, with the restriction that teams from the same association could not be drawn against each other.

In each group, teams played against each other home-and-away in a home-and-away round-robin format.

A total of six national associations were represented in the group stage.

Group A

Group B

Group C

Group D

Knockout phase
The knockout phase comprises a quarter-final round and a final four tournament with two semi-finals and a final. In the quarter-finals, group stage winners play against group stage runners-up (other than the one from their own group), the latter hosting the first of two legs. The winners qualify for the final four tournament, which will take place at the ground of one of the four finalists.

Bracket

Quarter-finals

|}

Final four
The final four tournament is taking place at Pavilhão João Rocha in Lisbon, Portugal, on 11–12 May 2019. The home ground of Sporting CP, one of the teams qualified for the final four, was selected as the host venue on 18 April. It is the first time that the Euroleague final four is played in this venue, and the second time it is hosted in Lisbon, after the 2016 edition was played at Benfica's Pavilhão Fidelidade. 

All times are local time (WEST or UTC+02:00).

Semi-finals

Final

See also
2018–19 World Skate Europe Cup
2018 CERH Continental Cup
2018–19 CERH Women's European Cup
 World Skate Europe - all competitions

References

External links
Comité Européen de Rink-Hockey (official website)

Rink Hockey Euroleague
CERH European League
CERH European League